is a Japanese professional wrestler signed to WWE, where she performs on the Raw brand under the ring name Iyo Sky (stylized in all caps). She is a member of Damage CTRL and former two-time WWE Women's Tag Team Champions with fellow stablemate Dakota Kai. She previously wrestled in WWE's developmental brand NXT under the ring name , where she was a former NXT Women's Champion and NXT Women's Tag Team Champion.

She is also known for her time in World Wonder Ring Stardom (Stardom), where she was a former two-time Wonder of Stardom Champion, six-time Artist of Stardom Champion, two-time World of Stardom Champion, the inaugural SWA World Champion, one-time Goddess of Stardom Champion, and one-time High Speed Champion. She was recognized as the "ace" of Stardom, and was the recipient of the 2015, 2016 and 2017 Tokyo Sports Joshi Puroresu Grand Prizes.

Making her debut in March 2007, she spent several years working as a tag team wrestler, teaming with her older sister Mio, with whom she wrestled for various promotions across Japan and Mexico, winning the TLW World Young Women's Tag Team Championship in the process. In June 2010, she and her sister came together with Kana to form the Triple Tails stable, which lasted for 15 months, before Io broke out of the group and embarked on her singles career in Stardom. Io quickly became one of the promotion's top stars, and in April 2013, she won the promotion's top title, the World of Stardom Championship, which she held twice, with each reign lasting for over a year. She worked for Stardom from 2011 until 2018, when she signed with WWE.

Professional wrestling career

Independent circuit

Team Makehen (2007–2010) 
Odate made her professional wrestling debut on March 4, 2007, alongside her older sister, with the two adopting the ring names Io and Mio Shirai, respectively ("Shirai" being Japanese for "Purple Thunder"). In their debut match, the Io sisters teamed with Toshie Uematsu to face the trio of Erika Ura, Nozomi Takesako and Yuri Urai. At the time of her debut, Io was only 16 years old, working part-time while attending high school. After graduating, she started working full-time as a professional wrestler. Starting their careers as freelancers, the Shirai sisters represented Team Makehen, a stable made up of wrestlers trained by Tomohiko Hashimoto, in several independent promotions during their first year in the business, including Ibuki, Pro Wrestling Wave, JWP Joshi Puroresu, and Sendai Girls' Pro Wrestling.

On October 19, 2008, Shirai and Mio made their debuts for one of Japan's largest professional wrestling promotions, All Japan Pro Wrestling (AJPW), wrestling in a match, where they defeated the team of Kyoko Kimura and Mikado. From January to March 2009, the Shirais also made several appearances for another large promotion not usually known for female wrestling, Pro Wrestling Zero1. On April 29, the Shirai sisters won their first championship by defeating Moeka Haruhi and Tomoka Nakagawa in a tournament final to become the first TLW (Totally Lethal Wrestling) World Young Women's Tag Team Champions. Despite its name, the championship was owned and promoted by Pro Wrestling Wave. On July 12, Io received her first singles title opportunity, when she unsuccessfully challenged Misaki Ohata for the JWP Junior and Princess of Pro-Wrestling Championships at Ibuki #30. From July to November, the Shirais spent four months working for the Ice Ribbon promotion.

On November 12, 2009, the Shirais entered Pro Wrestling Wave's Captain's Fall Six Person Tag Team Tournament, teaming with Gami, but the trio was defeated in their first round match by Ran Yu-Yu, Ryo Mizunami and Toshie Uematsu. However, the trio earned their way back into the tournament by defeating Misaki Ohata, Moeka Haruhi and Yumi Ohka in a consolation match later that same day. On November 25, the Shirais and Gami first defeated Bullfight Sora, Cherry and Kaoru in the semi-finals and then Ayumi Kurihara, Kana and Shuu Shibutani in the finals to win the tournament, with Io, as the captain, scoring the deciding pinfall over Shibutani. On December 23, the Shirais lost the TLW World Young Women's Tag Team Championship to Misaki Ohata and Moeka Haruhi. On May 30, 2010, Io entered the 2010 Catch the Wave tournament. After three wins and one loss, Shirai finished tied at the top of her block, but was on August 10 eliminated from the tournament, after being defeated in a tiebreaker match by Ryo Mizunami.

Triple Tails (2010–2011) 
On June 19, 2010, the Shirai sisters formed the Triple Tails stable with fellow freelancer Kana, defeating Ayumi Kurihara, Hikaru Shida and Yoshiko Tamura in their first match together at a NEO Japan Ladies Pro Wrestling event. As a result, the Shirais received a shot Kurihara's and Tamura's NEO Tag Team Championship on July 4, but were defeated by the defending champions. On August 1, Io teamed with Kana for another shot at title, but they were again defeated by Kurihara and Tamura. Triple Tails returned to its winning ways on August 29, by defeating Asami Kawasaki, Hikaru Shida and Nagisa Nozaki in a six-woman tag team match. On December 19, Triple Tails made its debut as a unit for Pro Wrestling Wave, defeating Cherry, Gami and Tomoka Nakagawa in a six-woman tag team main event.

On January 29, 2011, the Shirais made their debuts for Smash, when the Triple Tails stable attacked Yusuke Kodama and Makoto after their matches, with the trio being both times chased out of the ring by Tajiri. On February 13, Triple Tails produced its first own event, where the Shirai sisters wrestled male tag team Momo no Seishun Tag (Atsushi Kotoge and Daisuke Harada) in a losing effort. On February 25, the Shirais made their Smash in-ring debuts at Smash.14, where they teamed with Kana to defeat Ken Ohka, Tajiri and Yoshiaki Yago in an intergender six person tag team match. In March, Triple Tails took part in Osaka Pro Wrestling's Spring Samba Series, going undefeated in six person tag team matches for the duration of the tour. On April 30 at Smash.16, Triple Tails was defeated in a six-woman tag team match by Makoto, Serena and Syuri. On May 3 at Smash.17, the Shirai sisters were defeated in a tag team match by Hikaru Shida and Syuri. Triple Tails' second event took place on May 8 and saw Io, Mio and Kana defeat Akino, Kagetsu and Syuri in a main event six woman tag team match.

On July 23, Triple Tails held a press conference to announce that, following the group's third self-produced event on September 18, Io was leaving the stable in order to pursue a singles career. On August 21, Triple Tails made its debut for Oz Academy, defeating the trio of Ayumi Kurihara, Hiren and Yumi Ohka. On September 14, Triple Tails defeated Cherry, Moeka Haruhi and Shuu Shibutani in the group's final Pro Wrestling Wave appearance. Four days later, Triple Tails defeated Dash Chisako, Ryo Mizunami and Sendai Sachiko at their third self-produced event in the group's final appearance together.

Mexico (2010–2012, 2014, 2015) 
In 2010, Shirai traveled to Mexico, where she entered a local wrestling school to undergo further training. On October 14, 2010, Shirai, working under the ring name Biba Kasai, made her debut for International Wrestling Revolution Group (IWRG) at an event in Naucalpan, Mexico, where she teamed with Mini Abismo Negro, Monster Clown and Yuriko to defeat El Hijo de Cien Caras, Mari Apache, Mascarita Divina and Pasión Cristal via disqualification in an eight-person tag team match. In Mexico, both Shirais worked under cat-like masks they would only wear for their entrances in Japan. On October 31, both of the Shirai sisters were brought over to AAA, which had a working relationship with IWRG, and repackaged, with Io adopting the ring name Oyuki and Mio becoming Kaguya. In their first AAA match, Oyuki and Kaguya teamed with Yuriko in a six-person tag team match, where they were defeated by Cynthia Moreno, Gato Eveready and Mari Apache. During their stay in AAA, Oyuki and Kaguya became associates of the La Legión Extranjera (Foreign Legion) stable. On November 7, Oyuki and Kaguya defeated Faby and Mari Apache in a tag team match and afterwards stole Faby's AAA World Mixed Tag Team Championship and Mari's AAA Reina de Reinas Championship belts. On November 15, the Apaches and Cynthia Moreno defeated Oyuki, Kaguya and Sexy Star in a six-woman tag team match. A week later, Oyuki, Kaguya and Jennifer Blake defeated Moreno and the Apaches in another six woman tag team match. This would turn out to be Oyuki's and Kaguya's final AAA appearance, which resulted in the storyline with the Apaches being dropped without a conclusion.

Shirai, now working without her mask and under the ring name Io Shirai, returned to Mexico on May 15, 2011, at Lucha Fan Fest 4, where she teamed with Nosawa to defeat Chica Tormenta and Mike Segura for the vacant Americas World Mixed Tag Team Championship. In November 2011, Shirai returned to Mexico with Wrestling All-Star Pros (WASP) for another two-week tour. On November 1, Shirai put her hair on the line in her first Lucha de Apuestas Hair vs. Mask match, a four-way intergender elimination match, where she faced Ángel o Demonio, La Maléfica and Shitara. Eventually, the match came down to Shirai and La Maléfica, ending with Shirai submitting her opponent for the win, forcing her to unmask herself. Shirai and Nosawa defended the Americas World Mixed Tag Team Championship back in Japan on January 3, 2012, defeating Ken Ohka and Mio Shirai at a Union Pro Wrestling event. Shirai returned to Mexico on May 19, 2012, to take part in Lucha Expo in Mexico City, where she teamed with Keira to defeat Chica Tormenta and La Vaquerita in a tag team match.

Upon Shirai's return to Japan, she was arrested under suspicion of marijuana smuggling. This resulted in a two-year break from her regular trips to Mexico, before, on January 27, 2014, Shirai announced her return to the country. Shirai returned to Mexico on May 11 to take part in Toryumon Mexico's DragonMania 9 event, where she, Dark Angel, Kairi Hojo and Mayu Iwatani defeated Ahy Lyyn, Baby Star, Diosa Atenea and Mystique in an eight-woman tag team match. On May 23, 2015, Shirai returned to Mexico, first taking part in Toryumon Mexico's DragonMania 10 event in Arena México, where she, Diosa Atenea, Mayu Iwatani and Mima Shimoda defeated India Mazahua, India Sioux, Maligna and Xena in an eight-woman tag team match. Later that same day, Shirai also took part in Lucha Fan Fest 8, where she, Dos Caras and Vanely defeated Atenea, Iwatani and Brazo de Plata in a six-person tag team match.

World Wonder Ring Stardom (2011–2018) 
After leaving Triple Tails, Shirai, though still billed as a freelancer, effectively made World Wonder Ring Stardom her new home promotion, making her debut on August 14, 2011, when she teamed with Nanae Takahashi to defeat Yoko Bito and Yuzuki Aikawa in a tag team match, pinning Aikawa and afterwards challenging her to a match for the Wonder of Stardom Championship. Shirai continued to team with Takahashi the following month, before unsuccessfully challenging Aikawa for the Wonder of Stardom Championship on September 25. On October 10, Shirai and Takahashi entered the Goddesses of Stardom Tag League. When the tournament concluded two weeks later, Shirai and Takahashi finished with a record of one win and two losses and did not advance in the tournament. In January 2012, Shirai formed the Planet stable with Arisa Hoshiki, Mayu Iwatani and Natsumi Showzuki. On March 4, Shirai produced her own independent event named Carino!, which celebrated her fifth anniversary in professional wrestling and during which she officially aligned herself with Stardom, ending her freelancing days. In the main event of the show, Shirai teamed with Dark Angel, whom she had befriended during her time in Mexico, to defeat Miho Wakizawa and Nanae Takahashi in a tag team match. On March 25, Shirai unsuccessfully challenged Natsuki☆Taiyo for the High Speed Championship. On April 22, Shirai, Arisa Hoshiki and Natsumi Showzuki of the Planet stable made it to the finals of a six-woman tag team tournament, set to determine the number one stable in Stardom, however, there they were defeated by Nanae Gundan (Miho Wakizawa, Nanae Takahashi and Yuuri Haruka).

Following her May 2012 drug arrest and eventual acquittal, Shirai made her in-ring return on July 22, taking part in a Stardom Rumble to determine the final four participants in the 5★Star GP2012 tournament. Shirai scored the last elimination of the match, pinning Planet stablemate Mayu Iwatani to qualify for the tournament. Shirai finished the tournament, held from August 19 to September 30, with two wins, one draw and one loss, failing to advance to the finals. On October 27, Shirai and Mayu Iwatani entered the 2012 Goddesses of Stardom Tag League under the team name "Thunder Rock", defeating previous year's finalists, Kawasaki Katsushika Saikyou Densetsu (Natsuki☆Taiyo and Yoshiko) in their opening round-robin match. However, after losing their two remaining round-robin matches, Shirai and Iwatani failed to qualify for the finals of the tournament. Shirai finished her 2012 by losing to Kyoko Kimura on December 24 in a match, where the winner would earn the right to challenge for any of Stardom's titles. On January 14, 2013, Shirai, along with Planet stablemates Mayu Iwatani and Natsumi Showzuki, entered a tournament to determine the inaugural Artist of Stardom Champions. They were, however, eliminated in their first round match by Team Shimmer (Kellie Skater, Portia Perez and Tomoka Nakagawa). Six days later, Shirai and Iwatani unsuccessfully challenged Kawasaki Katsushika Saikyou Densetsu (Natsuki☆Taiyo and Yoshiko) for the Goddess of Stardom Championship.

On March 24, 2013, Shirai first defeated Kaori Yoneyama in the semi-finals and then Dark Angel in the finals to become the number one contender to the World of Stardom Championship at the biggest event in Stardom's history on April 29 at Ryōgoku Kokugikan. Shirai faced off with the reigning World of Stardom Champion, Alpha Female, for the first time on March 31, when she and Dark Angel were defeated in a tag team match by Kyoko Kimura and the champion, who pinned Shirai for a decisive win. On April 29 at Ryōgoku Cinderella, Shirai defeated Alpha Female to become the third World of Stardom Champion. Shirai made her first successful title defense on June 2 against Yoshiko. On August 17, Shirai defeated Kyoko Kimura for her second successful title defense. From August 25 to September 23, Shirai took part in 5★Star GP2013, where she finished with a record of three wins, one draw and one loss, with a draw on the final day against rookie Takumi Iroha costing her a spot in the finals. Shirai and Iroha then teamed up for the 2013 Goddesses of Stardom Tag Tournament, but were eliminated in their first round match on October 20 by Kairi Hojo and Nanae Takahashi, the winner of the 5★Star GP2013 who was now eyeing a shot at Shirai's World of Stardom Championship. The title match between Shirai and Takahashi took place on November 4 at Stardom's 100th event, where Shirai was victorious with only one second remaining in the thirty-minute time limit, making her third successful title defense. Post-match, Shirai offered the next shot at her title to JWP Joshi Puroresu wrestler Arisa Nakajima. Nakajima accepted the match on the condition that she could first regain the JWP Openweight Championship. On December 16, the day after Nakajima had regained the title, a title match between Shirai and Nakajima for both the World of Stardom and JWP Openweight Championships was made official for December 29. The match ended in a thirty-minute time limit draw, meaning that both champions retained their titles. Post-match, Shirai was challenged to another double title match by new High Speed Champion Natsuki☆Taiyo. At Stardom's annual awards ceremony later that same day, Shirai was named the promotion's MVP of 2013.

On January 26, 2014, at Stardom's third anniversary event, Shirai defeated High Speed Champion Natsuki☆Taiyo in a match, where only the World of Stardom Championship was on the line, to make her fifth successful title defense. Nearing the one-year anniversary of her World of Stardom Championship win, Shirai vowed to break Nanae Takahashi's records for both the longest reign (602 days) and most successful title defenses (seven), while also announcing she was accepting challengers from all over the world. Shirai made her sixth successful title defense against American wrestler Melissa on March 16, and the record-tying seventh successful defense against previous champion Alpha Female on April 29. On May 6, Shirai became a double champion in Stardom, when she defeated the soon-to-retire Natsuki☆Taiyo for the High Speed Championship. On May 17, Shirai made her record-setting eighth successful defense of the World of Stardom Championship by defeating Star Fire at Lucha Fan Fest 7 in Mexico City. Upon her return to Stardom, Shirai made her ninth successful title defense against Takumi Iroha on June 1. Afterwards, she offered the next title shot to Meiko Satomura, who had defeated her in a non-title match at a Sendai Girls' Pro Wrestling event on April 26. On July 10, Shirai defeated Satomura for her tenth successful defense of the World of Stardom Championship. On July 20, Shirai got an opportunity to become Stardom's first Triple Crown Champion, but she and Takumi Iroha, billed collectively as "Heisei Star", failed in their attempt to capture the Goddess of Stardom Championship from Kimura Monster-gun (Alpha Female and Kyoko Kimura). On August 10, Shirai lost the World of Stardom Championship to Yoshiko, ending her reign at 468 days and ten successful defenses.

After their World of Stardom Championship match against each other, Shirai and Yoshiko agreed to form a new partnership, which was also joined by Mayu Iwatani, Reo Hazuki and Takumi Iroha. The five, all born during the Heisei period, started a new rivalry with Stardom's older Shōwa period-born wrestlers, led by Nanae Takahashi. From August 24 to September 23, Shirai took part in the 2014 5★Star GP. After three wins and two losses, Shirai advanced to the finals, where she defeated Yoshiko to win the tournament. On November 3, Shirai and Yoshiko, whose partnership was now officially known as "Heisei-gun" ("Heisei Army"), unsuccessfully challenged Shōwa-gun's Kairi Hojo and Nanae Takahashi for the Goddess of Stardom Championship. Later that month, Shirai and Mayu Iwatani made it to the finals of the 2014 Goddesses of Stardom Tag League, but were defeated there by Hojo and Takahashi. On November 24, Shirai made her first successful defense of the High Speed Championship against Shōwa-gun's Koguma. On December 7, Shirai once again became a double champion, when she and Heisei-gun stablemates Mayu Iwatani and Takumi Iroha defeated Tomodachi Mania (Hatsuhinode Kamen, Kaori Yoneyama and Tsubasa Kuragaki) to win the Artist of Stardom Championship. On February 14, Shirai took part in her sister Mio's independent M.I.O event, defeating Mio in a main event singles match, which marked their first match together in three years. On February 22, Shirai lost the High Speed Championship to Koguma in her third defense. On March 29, following Yoshiko's suspension from Stardom, Shirai was entered into a four-woman tournament to determine the new World of Stardom Champion. After defeating Takumi Iroha, she advanced to the finals of the tournament, where she was defeated by Kairi Hojo. On April 14, Heisei-gun was stripped of the Artist of Stardom Championship due to Iroha being sidelined with a knee injury. On May 6, Shirai and Iwatani first defeated Oedo Tai (Kris Wolf and Star Fire) and then Candy Crush (Chelsea and Kairi Hojo) to win a tournament for the vacant Goddess of Stardom Championship. On May 17, Shirai defeated Nikki Storm in a decision match to win the vacant Wonder of Stardom Championship, becoming the first wrestler to have held all five of Stardom's championships.

Ahead of Mio Shirai's impending retirement from professional wrestling, she made her Stardom debut on July 26 to wrestle what was billed as the Shirai sisters' final match together, where Io and Mio defeated Hiroyo Matsumoto and Mayu Iwatani. On September 23, Shirai and Iwatani broke the record for most successful defenses of the Goddess of Stardom Championship by defeating Dash Chisako and Sendai Sachiko for their fourth defense. On October 17, Shirai defeated Mia Yim in Covina, California, during Stardom's first American tour, to make her sixth successful defense of the Wonder of Stardom Championship. During the second event in Baldwin Park, California two days later, Shirai and Iwatani made their fifth successful defense of the Goddess of Stardom Championship against Hiroyo Matsumoto and Kellie Skater. On November 8, Shirai and Iwatani won the 2015 Goddesses of Stardom Tag Tournament, defeating Alex Lee and Kaori Yoneyama in the first round and Hiroyo Matsumoto and Santana Garrett in the final match, which also marked their sixth successful defense of the Goddess of Stardom Championship. After seven successful title defenses, Shirai lost the Wonder of Stardom Championship to Santana Garrett on November 23 in a match also contested for Garrett's NWA World Women's Championship. On December 7, Tokyo Sports voted Shirai the joshi wrestler of the year over Kairi Hojo, Meiko Satomura and Saki Akai.

On December 23, Shirai defeated Meiko Satomura to become the first two-time World of Stardom Champion. Meanwhile, Thunder Rock also continued their reign as the Goddess of Stardom Champions, defeating the rookie team of Jungle Kyona and Momo Watanabe on January 10, 2016, for their seventh successful title defense. On January 17, Shirai made her first successful defense of the World of Stardom Championship against Kairi Hojo. On February 28, Shirai became a triple champion, when she, Iwatani and Kairi Hojo, billed collectively as "Threedom" (a combination of the words "Three" and "Stardom"), defeated Evie, Hiroyo Matsumoto and Kellie Skater to win the Artist of Stardom Championship. In April, Shirai, along with Iwatani and Hojo, traveled to the United States to take part in events held by Lucha Underground and Vendetta Pro Wrestling. On May 15, Thunder Rock faced off in a match, where Shirai defeated Iwatani to make her fourth successful defense of the World of Stardom Championship. Later in the month, Stardom wrestlers took part in a European tour, during which the promotion debuted the new Stardom World Association (SWA) World Championship. On May 21, Shirai first defeated Kay Lee Ray in the first round, then Dragonita in the semi-finals and finally Toni Storm in the finals to win the tournament and become the inaugural champion. After setting records for both the longest reign and most successful title defenses, Shirai and Iwatani lost the Goddess of Stardom Championship to Kagetsu and Kyoko Kimura in their 11th title defense on June 16. On July 24, Shirai lost the SWA World Championship to Toni Storm in her third defense. The following day, Shirai announced she was undergoing a tailbone surgery, but was only expected to miss one month of in-ring action. On October 2, Threedom lost the Artist of Stardom Championship to Oedo Tai (Hana Kimura, Kagetsu and Kyoko Kimura) in their third defense. On November 11, Thunder Rock made it to the finals of the 2016 Goddesses of Stardom Tag League. After losing to Kairi Hojo and Yoko Bito, Shirai turned on Iwatani, declared that Thunder Rock and Threedom were history and announced a new partnership with an unidentified masked woman.

On November 20, Shirai and her new partner, now revealed as the former Reo Hazuki and renamed "HZK", were joined by Momo Watanabe, who turned on Mayu Iwatani during a tag team match. The Shirai led new stable was later dubbed "Queen's Quest". On December 14, Shirai was awarded her second consecutive joshi wrestler of the year award by Tokyo Sports. Shirai closed her year by making her ninth successful defense of the World of Stardom Championship against former tag team partner Mayu Iwatani on December 22. On January 7, 2017, Queen's Quest became the new Artist of Stardom Champions by defeating Oedo Tai (Kagetsu, Kyoko Kimura and Viper) for the vacant title. On February 11, after Momo Watanabe had been sidelined with an injury, Azumi became the newest member of Queen's Quest, adopting the ring name "AZM". On February 23, Shirai made her eleventh successful defense of the World of Stardom Championship against Shayna Baszler, breaking her own record for most defenses of the title. On March 9, Shirai celebrated her tenth anniversary in professional wrestling with a special event, which saw her team with Meiko Satomura to defeat Chihiro Hashimoto and Mayu Iwatani in a main event tag team match. On April 9, Queen's Quest was stripped of the Artist of Stardom Championship due to Watanabe's injury. Queen's Quest, now represented by Shirai, AZM and HZK, regained the title six days later by defeating Oedo Tai (Hana Kimura, Kagetsu and Rosa Negra) in the finals of a four-team tournament. They lost the title to Hiromi Mimura, Kairi Hojo and Konami in their first defense on May 6, only to regain it on June 4. They lost the title to Team Jungle (Hiroyo Matsumoto, Jungle Kyona and Kaori Yoneyama) in their first defense on June 17. After a reign of 18 months with a record 14 successful title defenses, Shirai lost the World of Stardom Championship to Wonder of Stardom Champion Mayu Iwatani on June 21. The following day, Shirai announced that she was going on an indefinite hiatus to undergo treatment for a neck injury. She had suffered the injury taking a piledriver from Toni Storm during their World of Stardom Championship match on May 14.

Shirai returned from her injury on July 30, offering Oedo Tai member Viper a membership in Queen's Quest. After Viper accepted the offer, Shirai vowed to regain the Artist of Stardom Championship and win the 2017 5★Star GP. Shirai's return match took place on August 13, when she, HZK and Viper regained the Artist of Stardom Championship from Matsumoto, Kyona and Yoneyama. On November 19, Shirai defeated Yoko Bito to win the Wonder of Stardom Championship for the second time. On December 14, Shirai became the first wrestler in history to win three consecutive female wrestler of the year awards from Tokyo Sports. On April 21, 2018, Shirai made her tenth successful defense of the Wonder of Stardom Championship against Martina, breaking Santana Garrett's record for most defenses of the title. On May 23, Shirai lost the Wonder of Stardom Championship to Momo Watanabe in her twelfth title defense. On May 29, 2018, Stardom announced Shirai's departure after her last match on June 10. Shirai wrestled her final matches for Stardom on June 10 taking part of a ten-match one-minute time limit series against members of the Stardom roster that ended in one win and one loss.

WWE

Signing and Mae Young Classic (2017–2018) 
In October 2016, the Wrestling Observer Newsletter reported that both Shirai and Kairi Hojo had been contacted and offered WWE contracts, starting in 2017. Reportedly, Shirai had informed Stardom's management that she was taking the offer. In March 2017, Shirai took part in a WWE tryout at the WWE Performance Center in Orlando, Florida. Her tryout was not supposed to go public, but due to a communications issue, she was featured on WWE's official website in an article that was taken down shortly afterwards. After the tryout, Shirai confirmed that she had been offered a contract.

On May 15, 2017, Dave Meltzer of the Wrestling Observer Newsletter reported that Shirai had accepted the contract offer from WWE. The following month, it was reported that a WWE medical examination had discovered a neck injury that would delay Shirai's WWE debut. In August, Meltzer reported that just as doctors had cleared Shirai to return to the ring, WWE had rescinded their contract offer, noting the company had a "general rule of not wanting to bring in new talent that either has concussion issues or neck issues". It was later reported that the medical examination had also found an issue with Shirai's heart. Japanese doctors had cleared Shirai for both her heart and neck, but WWE doctors suggested passing on signing her. Six months later on May 28, 2018, Tokyo Sports reported that Shirai was in discussions with WWE. On May 29, Shirai announced she would be leaving Stardom.

Shirai made her first official appearance for the promotion on June 30, 2018, at the WWE house show in Ryōgoku Kokugikan, where it was announced she had signed with the promotion and would be competing in their developmental territory, NXT. In July, it was announced that Shirai would participate in the second Mae Young Classic tournament. On August 8, Shirai defeated Xia Brookside in the tournament's first round in her WWE debut match. The following day, on August 9, Shirai defeated Zeuxis in the second round, Deonna Purrazzo in the quarterfinals and Rhea Ripley in the semi–finals to advance to the finals of the tournament, that took place at WWE Evolution, on October 28, where Shirai was defeated by Toni Storm.

NXT (2018–2022) 
In her first appearance for NXT, Shirai debuted on November 17, 2018, at TakeOver: WarGames where she and Dakota Kai saved her best friend Kairi Sane during her match with Shayna Baszler from an assault by her allies Jessamyn Duke and Marina Shafir. She made her debut match on the December 19 episode of NXT, where she teamed with Kai and they defeated Duke and Shafir in a tag team match, and because of her win, a week later, Shirai competed in a fatal four-way match to determine the number one contender for the NXT Women's Championship, however, the match was won by Bianca Belair. Shortly after, with Kai sidelined with an injury, Shirai continued to team with Sane, forming a tag team known as "The Sky Pirates" while continuing to defeat various teams.

On April 5, 2019, at TakeOver: New York, Shirai and Sane took part in a fatal four-way match for the NXT Women's Championship, however, both were unsuccessful in capturing the title as Baszler submitted Bianca Belair to retain the title. Just six days later on April 11 (episode aired on tape delay on April 17), Shirai interfered in Sane's rematch with Baszler and attacked her as she was looking to injure Sane, resulting in a disqualification loss for Sane. As a result, Sane was not allowed to challenge for the NXT Women's Championship anymore, which was a way to write her off the brand.

Following Sane's move to the main roster, and the disbanding of The Sky Pirates, Shirai continued her feud with Baszler, Duke and Shafir as the three continuously attacked her. This ultimately led to a title match between Shirai and Baszler for the NXT Women's Championship at TakeOver: XXV on June 1, 2019. At the event, Shirai was unsuccessful in defeating Baszler, despite Candice LeRae's interference and attack on Duke and Shafir. A few weeks later, on the June 26 episode of NXT, Shirai received a rematch against Baszler in a steel cage match, however, she once again failed to capture the title. After the match, Shirai attacked LeRae (who once again took out Duke and Shafir) herself, turning heel. In the summer, Shirai developed a new image, using a new entrance theme and wearing black leather and continued her rivalry with LeRae. The storyline between the two culminated in a match at TakeOver: Toronto on August 10, which Shirai won via submission.

In November, Shirai was announced as one of the participants in the first-ever women's WarGames match as part of Shayna Baszler's team who was feuding with Rhea Ripley. At TakeOver: WarGames, Baszler's team lost to Ripley and Candice LeRae, despite having a 2-on-4 handicap advantage. The next night at Survivor Series, Shirai competed as part of Team NXT, in the first-ever 5-on-5-on-5 Women's Survivor Series match, where her team won and she was one of the survivors. During a match against Toni Storm on the January 22, 2020, episode of NXT, Shirai suffered a minor injury that kept her out of action for two months.

Shirai returned on the March 25 episode of NXT, defeating Aliyah and also qualifying for a number one contender's ladder match. On the April 8 episode of NXT, Shirai won the ladder match for an opportunity against the new NXT Women's Champion Charlotte Flair. She received her title match on the May 6 episode of NXT, which she won via disqualification when Flair attacked her with a kendo stick. Throughout May, Shirai entered a storyline with both Flair and Ripley (whom Flair defeated to win the title at WrestleMania 36), which led to a triple threat match at TakeOver: In Your House. At the event, on June 7, Shirai defeated both Flair and Ripley to win the NXT Women's Championship, marking her first title win in WWE. Shirai defeated Sasha Banks in a non-title match at The Great American Bash special episode of NXT. During the summer, Shirai slowly transitioned into a tweener and successfully defended her title against Tegan Nox and Dakota Kai at TakeOver XXX. In September, Shirai renewed her rivalry with Candice LeRae. Their feud sparked two title matches at TakeOver 31 and Halloween Havoc, including the first ever tables, ladders and scares match, in which Shirai was able to retain her title. On November 18 episode of NXT, Shirai successfully retained her title against Rhea Ripley. At TakeOver: WarGames, Shirai was a part of Team Blackheart (herself, Shotzi Blackheart, Rhea Ripley and Ember Moon) who faced Team Lerae (Candice LeRae, Toni Storm, Dakota Kai and Raquel González) in a losing effort in which Shirai was pinned by González. On February 14, 2021, at TakeOver: Vengeance Day Shirai defeated Mercedes Martinez and Toni Storm in a triple threat match to retain the NXT Women's Championship. On the March 10, episode of NXT, Shirai was challenged by Storm for the title, which she retained. On April 7 in the main event of Night 1 of TakeOver: Stand & Deliver, she lost the title to Raquel González, ending her reign at 304 days.

Shirai made her return on the June 8 episode of NXT. In the following weeks, Shirai allied with Zoey Stark as a tag team. On the June 29 episode of NXT, they won a triple threat match to become the number one contenders for the NXT Women's Tag Team Championship. At The Great American Bash, Shirai and Stark defeated The Way (Candice LeRae and Indi Hartwell) to win the titles. On the September 7 episode of NXT, they defended their championship in a title match against the team of Kacy Catanzaro and Kayden Carter. They successfully retained their titles in a match against the Toxic Attraction (Gigi Dolin and Jacy Jayne) on the September 28 episode of NXT. At Halloween Havoc, in a triple threat Scareway to Hell Ladder match against the Toxic Attraction and the team of Indi Hartwell and Persia Pirotta, they lost to Toxic Attraction, ending their reign at 111 days.

At WarGames, Shirai teamed with Cora Jade, Kay Lee Ray, and Raquel González. They defeated the team of Dakota Kai and Toxic Attraction in a WarGames match. In 2022, Shirai allied with Kay Lee Ray after saving the latter from Toxic Attraction's attack. As a tag team, they then entered Women's Dusty Rhodes Tag Team Classic. They defeated the team of Amari Miller and Lash Legend in the first round, Kacy Catanzaro and Kayden Carter in the semi-finals, Wendy Choo and Dakota Kai in the finals and won Women's Dusty Cup. Shirai and Ray then decided to challenge Mandy Rose for NXT Women's Championship at Stand & Deliver instead of challenging tag team champions Dolin and Jayne. They were unsuccessful in winning the title. Then she was out of action with an injury.

Damage CTRL (2022–present) 

On July 30, 2022, Shirai made her return from injury at SummerSlam alongside Bayley and Dakota Kai, with the three being allies and confronting Raw Women's Champion Bianca Belair. Shirai was presented under the new ring name Iyo Sky and joined the Raw brand as a heel. On the following episode of Raw, the trio targeted and attacked Becky Lynch, Alexa Bliss, and Asuka. Sky's debut match was against Belair in a non-title match resulting in no-contest due to interference from Asuka, Bliss, Kai, and Bayley entering the ring and starting a fight. In the following week, the trio challenged Asuka, Belair, and Bliss for a six-woman tag team match at Clash at the Castle. Sky and Kai then participated in Women's Tag Team Championship Tournament and won the first round and semi-finals but they were unsuccessful in winning the finals and WWE Women's Tag Team Championship. At Clash at the Castle, the stable of Sky, Bayley, and Kai was named as Damage CTRL and they won their match. On the September 12 episode of Raw, Sky and Kai defeated Women's Tag Team Champions Aliyah and Raquel Rodriguez in a rematch to win the championship. On the October 31 episode of Raw, they lost their title to the team of Asuka and Bliss; ending their reign at 48 days. Sky and Kai then reclaimed the titles at Crown Jewel in a rematch. At Survivor Series WarGames, Damage CTRL, Rhea Ripley, and Nikki Cross lost to Belair, Asuka, Bliss, Mia Yim, and Becky Lynch in a WarGames match.

In January 2023, Sky participated in the women's Royal Rumble match at the titular event. She eliminated five wrestlers, four of which were done by her, Bayley, and Kai, before being eliminated by Lynch. On the February 27 episode of Raw, Sky and Kai lost titles to Lynch and Lita; ending their second reign at 114 days.

Professional wrestling persona and legacy 
Shirai noted that her professional wrestling persona is inspired by Rey Mysterio. In 2016, Dave Meltzer of the Wrestling Observer Newsletter referred to Shirai and her fellow Japanese wrestlers Kairi Hojo and Mayu Iwatani as "three of the best wrestlers in the world".

Other media 
In March 2017, Odate was featured in a gravure spread on the Weekly Playboy magazine. Odate made her video game debut as a playable character in WWE 2K20, and subsequently in WWE 2K22 and WWE 2K23.

Personal life 
Odate was previously in a relationship with fellow professional wrestler Kazushige Nosawa; the two lived together in Koto, Tokyo. She is a fan of Hiroshi Tanahashi and Momoiro Clover Z.

On May 23, 2012, Odate and Nosawa were arrested at the Narita International Airport in Narita, Chiba upon their return from Mexico under suspicion of trying to smuggle 75 grams of marijuana, hidden inside paintings of the two, into the country. Both Odate and Nosawa denied the charges, claiming that the paintings were gifts from fans. Odate was released from a detention center on June 12. On June 21, Odate held a press conference, publicly apologizing to her fans, employers and co-workers, while again denying the charges. Odate also revealed that she had not considered retirement, but wanted to work again and regain the trust of her peers and fans, while also revealing that she and Nosawa had ended their relationship. On June 28, Japan's public prosecutor's office decided not to prosecute Odate over the incident. On July 9, Mexico based Japanese wrestler Takuya Sugi held a press conference and confessed to planting the drugs on Shirai and Nosawa. According to Sugi, Masahiro Hayashi, who worked as a liaison between AAA and Japan and who had a personal grudge with Nosawa, had promised him a contract extension with AAA in exchange for the deed.

Championships and accomplishments 
 JWP Joshi Puroresu
 5th Junior All Star Photogenic Award (2007) – with Mio Shirai
 Pro Wrestling Illustrated
 Ranked No. 4 of the top 100 female wrestlers in the PWI Women's 100 in 2018
 Pro Wrestling Wave
 TLW World Young Women's Tag Team Championship (1 time) – with Mio Shirai
 Captain's Fall Six Person Tag Team Tournament (2009) – with Gami and Mio Shirai
 TLW World Young Women's Tag Team Tournament (2009) – with Mio Shirai
 Sports Illustrated
 Ranked No. 7 of the top 10 wrestlers in 2020
 Tokyo Sports
 Joshi Puroresu Grand Prize (2015, 2016, and 2017)
 World Wonder Ring Stardom
 Artist of Stardom Championship (6 times) – with Mayu Iwatani and Takumi Iroha (1), Kairi Hojo and Mayu Iwatani (1), HZK and Momo Watanabe (1), AZM and HZK (2), and HZK and Viper (1)
 Goddess of Stardom Championship (1 time) – with Mayu Iwatani
 High Speed Championship (1 time)
 SWA World Championship (1 time)
 Wonder of Stardom Championship (2 times)
 World of Stardom Championship (2 times)
 5★Star GP (2014)
 Artist of Stardom Championship Tournament (2017) – with AZM and HZK
 Goddess of Stardom Championship Tournament (2015) – with Mayu Iwatani
 Goddesses of Stardom Tag League (2015) – with Mayu Iwatani
 Red Belt Challenger Tournament (2013)
 SWA World Championship Tournament (2016)
 First Grand Slam Champion
 5★Star GP Award (3 times)
 5★Star GP Best Match Award (2015) vs. Mayu Iwatani on August 23
 5★Star GP Technique Award (2013, 2017)
 Stardom Year-End Award (8 times)
 Best Match Award (2015) vs. Meiko Satomura on December 23
 Best Match Award (2016) vs. Mayu Iwatani on December 22
 Best Match Award (2018) with Mayu Iwatani vs. Kagetsu and Hazuki on June 17
 Best Tag Team Award (2015) with Mayu Iwatani
 MVP Award (2013, 2014, 2016)
 Outstanding Performance Award (2017)
 WWE
 WWE Women's Tag Team Championship (2 times) – with Dakota Kai
 NXT Women's Championship (1 time)
 NXT Women's Tag Team Championship (1 time) – with Zoey Stark
 Women's Dusty Rhodes Tag Team Classic (2022) – with Kay Lee Ray
 NXT Year-End Award (3 times)
 Future Star of NXT (2018)
 Female Competitor of the Year (2020)
 Overall Competitor of the Year (2020)
 Other titles
 Americas World Mixed Tag Team Championship (1 time) – with Nosawa

Luchas de Apuestas record

References

External links 

 
 
 
 

1990 births
Expatriate professional wrestlers
Japanese expatriate sportspeople in the United States
Japanese female professional wrestlers
Living people
Masked wrestlers
People from Kamakura
Sportspeople from Kanagawa Prefecture
Japanese gravure idols
NXT Women's Tag Team Champions
NXT Women's Champions
21st-century professional wrestlers
World of Stardom Champions
Goddess of Stardom Champions
Artist of Stardom Champions
High Speed Champions
SWA World Champions
WWE Women's Tag Team Champions